Poland has a rich selection of Gold and Silver commemorative coins. In the year 1999 coins were launched in the series: "Polish Travelers  and Explorers", "Animals of the World", "Polish kings and princes", "Castles and palaces of Poland" and various occasional coins.

Table of contents

See also

 Numismatics
 Regular issue coinage
 Coin grading

References

Commemorative coins of Poland